Clément Lhotellerie (born 19 March 1986) is a French former professional road racing cyclist.

Career
Born in Charleville-Mézières, Ardennes, Lhotellerie was an accomplished mountain-biker and cyclo-cross rider before switching to the road. He had won the French cyclo-cross championships in Juniors and U23 categories. He turned professional for  cycling team in 2007. In early 2008 he finished second in the first stage and the overall classification of Vuelta a Andalucía. He later won the Mountains classification of Paris–Nice and also finished second in the third stage and eleventh in the overall classification.

Lhotellerie returned to the amateur ranks in 2014, with Team Peltrax-CS Dammarie-lès-Lys.

Doping
On 2 July 2009 his team announced that he had tested positive for methylhexanamine, which Lhotellerie claimed was from contaminated geranium oil.

Major results
Source:

2003
 1st  Junior race, National Cyclo-cross Championships
2004
 1st  Junior race, National Cyclo-cross Championships
 3rd  Junior race, UCI Cyclo-cross World Championships
 3rd  Junior race, UEC European Cyclo-cross Championships
2006
 1st  Under-23 race, National Cyclo-cross Championships
 1st Overall Circuit de Saône-et-Loire
2007
 1st  Mountains classification 3-Länder-Tour
 4th Overall Tour du Limousin
 9th Overall Niedersachsen-Rundfahrt
2008
 1st  Mountains classification Paris–Nice
 1st Stage 1b (TTT) Brixia Tour
 2nd Overall Vuelta a Andalucía
 2nd Overall Four Days of Dunkirk
2012
 1st Flèche Ardennaise
2013
 3rd Omloop Het Nieuwsblad U23
 5th Overall Boucle de l'Artois
 6th Circuit de Wallonie
 10th Flèche Ardennaise
2015
 1st  National Cyclo-cross Championships

References

External links

Palmares on CyclingBase (French)

1986 births
Living people
People from Charleville-Mézières
French male cyclists
Doping cases in cycling
French sportspeople in doping cases
Sportspeople from Ardennes (department)
Cyclo-cross cyclists
Cyclists from Grand Est